Artie Hall (–1939) was an American vaudeville singer and actress, known for her blackface performances as a coon shouter. She was a "petite vocalist with a strong voice".  Her most successful role was Topsy in William A. Brady's version of Uncle Tom's Cabin.  A controversial part of her act was the removal of a glove to reveal her white skin at the end of a song.

Artie Hall was initially reported to have died during the April 18, 1906, San Francisco earthquake. This apparently was misconstrued, and misquoted by the New York Times before it was discovered she didn't die.

Hall was married circa 1899 to an actor named Robert Fulgora. They were divorced by September 1914. She later married William Atwell, a vaudeville agent. Hall died from a kidney ailment at her home in Astoria, Queens, New York on March 20, 1939, aged 58.

Her sister, Pauline Des Landes (known professionally as Bonita) was also a vaudeville actress.

References

External links

1880s births
1939 deaths
American stage actresses
Vaudeville performers
20th-century American actresses
Actresses from Atlanta
Musicians from Atlanta
1906 San Francisco earthquake survivors
20th-century American women singers
20th-century American singers